Liptena eukrinoides is a butterfly in the family Lycaenidae. It is found in Uganda (the western shores of Lake Victoria) and north-western Tanzania. The habitat consists of forests.

References

Butterflies described in 1937
Liptena